Levyne or levynite is a zeolite mineral, i.e. a hydrated silicate mineral.  There are two forms of levyne: 
Levyne-Na, the sodium dominated form, and 
Levyne-Ca the calcium dominated form

Levyne crystallizes in the Trigonal - Hexagonal Scalenohedral class. It typically occurs as radiating clusters or fibrous masses that are transparent to translucent in colors ranging from white through reddish and yellowish white to gray. It has a specific gravity of 2.09 - 2.16 and a Mohs hardness of 4.0 to 4.5. It has a vitreous luster and  perfect cleavage on [1011]. Typical occurrence is as an alteration and vesicle filling mineral in basalts.

It was named for French mineralogist Armand Lévy (1795–1841).
The calcium variety was first described in 1821 for an occurrence in Dalsnipa, Sandoy, Faroe Islands. The sodium variety was described in 1997 for an occurrence in Chojabaru, Nagasaki Prefecture, Japan.

References

Webmineral - Levyne-Ca
Webmineral - Levyne-Na

External links
Structure type LEV

Zeolites
Trigonal minerals
Minerals in space group 166